Heidi Schüller (born June 15, 1950 in Passau, Lower Bavaria) is a West German-German long jumper who competed in the early 1970s. She took the Athlete's Oath at the 1972 Summer Olympics in Munich, the first for a woman in the Summer Olympics. Schüller finished fifth in the women's long jump at those same games.

As of 2008, she lives in Aachen.

References
Aachen information on Schüller

IOC 1972 Summer Olympics
Wallechinsky, David (1984). "Track and Field, Women: Long Jump". In The Complete Book of the Olympics: 1896-1980. New York: Penguin Book. p/ 143.

1950 births
Living people
People from Passau
Sportspeople from Lower Bavaria
Athletes (track and field) at the 1972 Summer Olympics
German female long jumpers
Olympic athletes of West Germany
Oath takers at the Olympic Games
Universiade bronze medalists for West Germany
Universiade medalists in athletics (track and field)